Aleksandr Potashov (Russian: Александр Поташёв; born 12 March 1962) is a retired race walker who represented the USSR and later Belarus. He won the gold medal over 50 kilometres at the 1991 World Championships. Potashov and his teammate Andrey Perlov attempted to cross the goal line simultaneously, resulting in a shared gold medal, but the officials declared Potashov the winner by 0.01 second.

Potashov finished fourth at the 1988 Summer Olympics in Seoul and was disqualified at the 1992 Olympics. His personal best time is 3:40:02, achieved in May 1990.

International competitions

References

1962 births
Living people
Sportspeople from Vitebsk
Belarusian male racewalkers
Soviet male racewalkers
Olympic athletes of the Soviet Union
Olympic athletes of Belarus
Athletes (track and field) at the 1988 Summer Olympics
Athletes (track and field) at the 1992 Summer Olympics
World Athletics Championships athletes for the Soviet Union
World Athletics Championships medalists
Soviet Athletics Championships winners
World Athletics Championships winners